The High Commission of Fiji in London is the diplomatic mission of Fiji in the United Kingdom. It is situated on Hyde Park Gate opposite the Embassy of Estonia.

Gallery

References

External links
 Official site

Fiji
Diplomatic missions of Fiji
Fiji–United Kingdom relations
Buildings and structures in the Royal Borough of Kensington and Chelsea
South Kensington
Fiji and the Commonwealth of Nations
United Kingdom and the Commonwealth of Nations